Víctor Hugo Aristizábal Posada (born 9 December 1971) is a Colombian retired professional footballer who played as a striker. He scored 15 goals in 66 games for the Colombia national team between 1993 and 2003.

Club career
Aristizábal was born in Medellín, Antioquia. He started his career in Atlético Nacional, and played there from 1990 to 1996 only interrupted by a short spell with Valencia CF in 1994. Winning the Colombian league twice with Nacional, he eventually moved to play in Brazil. He played for São Paulo and Santos before spending two seasons at Nacional and Deportivo Cali. In 2002, he once again moved to Brazil, and played for EC Vitória, Cruzeiro and Coritiba. Aristizábal is the all-time top foreign goalscorer in the Brazilian league. He is also the all-time Colombian goalscorer with 348 goals, of which about 200 goals were scored with Atlético Nacional, club which he is also the top goalscorer. He is the only player that has won six championship with Atlético Nacional. He announced his retirement from football in November 2007 after suffering an awkward knee injury.

International career
Between 1993 and 2003, Aristizábal played 66 international matches and scored 15 goals for the Colombia national team. He was an unused substitute for the 1994 FIFA World Cup, but played all three matches at the 1998 FIFA World Cup.

Aristizábal finished as top scorer with six goals in the 2001 Copa América held in Colombia, as Los Cafeteros won the title for the first time. He was also a member of the nation's squad for the 2003 FIFA Confederations Cup, where they finished in fourth place.

During the 2006 FIFA World Cup qualification campaign, Aristizábal announced he was retiring from international soccer after being dropped for a match against Brazil.

Career statistics

Club

International
Scores and results list Colombia's goal tally first, score column indicates score after each Aristizábal goal.

Honours
Atlético Nacional
 Fútbol Profesional Colombiano: 1991, 1994, 1999, 2005-I, 2007-I, 2007-II
 Copa Interamericana: 1990, 1995
 Copa Merconorte: 2000

Cruzeiro
 Campeonato Brasileiro Série A: 2003
 Copa do Brasil: 2003
 Campeonato Mineiro: 2003

Coritiba
 Campeonato Paranaense: 2004

Colombia
 Copa América: 2001

Individual
 Copa América top scorer: 2001
 Colombian League top scorer: 2005-I

References

External links

 Midfield Dynamo's 10 Heroes of the Copa América Víctor Aristizábal listed in the top 10

1971 births
Living people
Colombian footballers
Association football forwards
Colombia international footballers
Olympic footballers of Colombia
Copa América-winning players
Colombian people of Basque descent
Footballers at the 1992 Summer Olympics
1994 FIFA World Cup players
1998 FIFA World Cup players
1993 Copa América players
1995 Copa América players
1997 Copa América players
2001 Copa América players
2003 FIFA Confederations Cup players
Categoría Primera A players
Campeonato Brasileiro Série A players
La Liga players
Atlético Nacional footballers
Valencia CF players
São Paulo FC players
Santos FC players
Deportivo Cali footballers
Esporte Clube Vitória players
Cruzeiro Esporte Clube players
Coritiba Foot Ball Club players
Colombian expatriate footballers
Colombian expatriate sportspeople in Spain
Expatriate footballers in Spain
Colombian expatriate sportspeople in Brazil
Expatriate footballers in Brazil
Footballers from Medellín